Islander is an American rock band from Greenville, South Carolina, founded in 2011. The group is currently signed with Better Noise Music. Their releases include numerous singles as well as two EPs, Side Effects of Youth (2012) and Pains. (2013), and three studio albums, Violence & Destruction (2014), Power Under Control (2016), and It's Not Easy Being Human (2022). The band is known for its uniquely dynamic and interactive live performances, as noted in various concert review publications.

History 
The original members of Islander hail from  Greenville, South Carolina, and have been playing together since 2006; they broke up for a few years and got together under the name Islander in 2011.

Islander vocalist Mikey Carvajal is a participant in the non-profit outreach organization known as The Whosoevers. Some members of the organization include Brian "Head" Welch and Reginald "Fieldy" Arvizu of Korn, Sonny Sandoval of P.O.D., Lacey Sturm formerly of Flyleaf, and motivational speaker Ryan Ries.

On June 17, 2016, the band released a new song, titled "Darkness", with the lineup of J.R. Bareis  (Love & Death) on Guitar, Ezekiel Vasquez (ex-ForeverAtLast) on Bass, and Arin Ilejay (ex-Confide, ex-Avenged Sevenfold) on Drums. The new song, and album Power Under Control, indicated a mixture on Nu-metal, emo, punk rock and alternative metal. On June 20, 2016, the band released "Bad Guy" from the upcoming Power Under Control, which will be released through the band's label Victory Records on August 5, 2016. On August 4, 2016, Alternative Press put out a stream for Islander's Power Under Control, the album to be released through Victory and produced by Cameron Webb, who also produced Violence & Destruction, at NRG Studios.

On August 31, 2018, Eleventyseven lead singer Matt Langston interviewed Mikey Carvajal on the Eleventylife podcast and discussed the music industry, growing up in the South Carolina, and navigating band politics.

In March 2020, during the Covid-19 Pandemic, the band released a cover of the R.E.M. song It's The End Of The World As We Know It (And I Feel Fine). The release was dedicated to lead singer Mikey Carvajal's aunt, who had recently died as a result of the virus. A portion of proceeds from the release were donated to the NYC Low-Income Artist + Freelancer Relief Fund.

Music 
Victory Records signed the band in September 2013, and soon released their second EP, Pains. Their first studio album, Violence & Destruction, was released the next year. The music's material was generally well received by critics, as the first single off the Violence & Destruction, entitled "Coconut Dracula", has since been a very successful active rock radio hit, as it hit number 23 on the Billboard Mainstream Rock chart. On January 13, the band released a music video for the track "New Wave", the highly anticipated follow-up to the "Coconut Dracula" music video, which premiered exclusively on Billboard.

In February 2021, the band released a new single, called The Outsider. In an interview, lead singer Mikey Carvajal described it as "a song for anyone that feels like an outcast [or] is struggling to fit in."

The band has received support from many big names within the music community. Sonny Sandoval of P.O.D. said "New school band with old school soul and passion. Keep your eyes and ears open for these guys!".  Brian "Head" Welch of Korn and Love and Death tweeted "A new, unique, sick band with a CD full of great songs. You won't regret getting Islander." Lacey Sturm of the band Flyleaf tweeted a picture of Violence & Destruction stating it was her "New Favorite Music".

Touring 
The group toured with the Mayhem Festival 2014 tour including label acts Emmure, Ill Niño and Wretched in the summer of 2014, followed by tours with Otherwise, Nonpoint and Pop Evil in the fall. Islander began a U.S. tour with Papa Roach, Seether and Kyng in early January 2015, extending until early February. In 2019, they provided direct support for Blessthefall and Escape The Fate on their joint ten-year anniversary tour. Other acts they have toured with include P.O.D., Red, I Prevail, and Korn. They have also headlined several of their own tours, receiving support from acts such as The Funeral Portrait and Palaye Royale. They have played at numerous Rock Festivals such as Carolina Rebellion, Rock on the Range, Shiprocked, and Welcome to Rockville, with artists such as Marilyn Manson, Slipknot, The Red Jumpsuit Apparatus and Linkin Park.

Style 
Their music is similar to Deftones, Glassjaw, Korn, Papa Roach, Limp Bizkit, Mudvayne, P.O.D., and Rage Against the Machine because musically it is alternative metal and rap metal, all the while, having a nu metal sound featuring the subsets alternative rock, hard rock, punk rock, and post-hardcore. Chino Moreno, Daryl Palumbo, Jonathan Davis, Fred Durst, Chad Gray, Sonny Sandoval, Zack de la Rocha are cited as vocal similarities to Carvajal.

Band members 

Current members
 Mikey Carvajal – lead vocals (2011–present)
 Erik Shea – guitars (2017–present)
 Chris Carvajal – keyboards (2017–present), bass (2021-present)

Touring members
 Tyler Armenta – drums (2021–present)

Former members
 J.R. Bareis – guitars, backing vocals (2014–2017), bass (2015)
 Ezekiel Vasquez – bass, backing vocals (2015–2017)
 Arin Ilejay – drums (2015–2017)
 Andrew Fleming – drums (2017–2019)
 Andrew Murphy – guitars (2011–2014)
 Chris Doot – bass (2011–2015)
 Eric Frazier – drums (2011–2015)

Timeline

Discography

EPs 
 Side Effects of Youth (Independent, 2012)
Pains. (Victory Records, 2013)

Studio albums

Singles

Music Videos

References

External links 
Islander at Victory Records

2011 establishments in South Carolina
Alternative rock groups from South Carolina
American alternative metal musical groups
American Christian metal musical groups
American hard rock musical groups
American nu metal musical groups
American post-hardcore musical groups
Heavy metal musical groups from South Carolina
Musical groups established in 2011
Victory Records artists